The Stamford Colonels were a West Texas League baseball team based in Stamford, Texas, United States that played in 1922. They are the only professional baseball team to ever come out of Stamford.

In their only year of existence, they went 56-76, finishing seventh in the league.

References

Defunct minor league baseball teams
1922 establishments in Texas
1922 disestablishments in Texas
Baseball teams established in 1922
Baseball teams disestablished in 1922
Defunct baseball teams in Texas